Ghana participated in the 2010 Summer Youth Olympics in Singapore.

Athletics

Boys
Field Events

Girls
Track and Road Events

Field hockey

Swimming

References

External links
Competitors List: Ghana

2010 in Ghanaian sport
Nations at the 2010 Summer Youth Olympics
Ghana at the Youth Olympics